This is a list of naval battles in history where steel vessels rated as battleships and/or battlecruisers engaged each other in combat.

References

Naval warfare
Battleships